The Carbon 15 is a family of lightweight, magazine-fed pistols, carbines, and rifles developed by defunct United States weapons manufacturer Professional Ordnance, with the design later picked up by Bushmaster Firearms.

Overview
The Carbon 15 line is closely based on the Colt AR-15 design. They are distinguished by their carbon fiber construction, which provides an extremely lightweight frame. The Carbon 15 line are generally chambered in 5.56×45mm NATO/.223 Remington, however, there are also 9×19mm Parabellum versions of the pistol and carbine.

In early 2009, Bushmaster began to include the dust cover and forward assist in their Carbon-15 M4 rifles.

Users
 : Used by Royal Malaysian Police and VAT 69 Commando
 : Used by Peruvian Naval Infantry Special Forces

References

See also
 PLR-16

5.56 mm firearms
Semi-automatic pistols of the United States
5.56×45mm NATO semi-automatic rifles
9mm Parabellum semi-automatic pistols
Bushmaster firearms
ArmaLite AR-10 derivatives